Vittorio was launched at Whitby in 1813 as a transport. A new owner shifted her registration to London in December 1817. The new owner then employed her in trading with India under a license from the British East India Company. She was condemned at Calcutta and sold for breaking up in October 1820.

The Register of Shipping for 1820 showed Vittoria, Driver, master, with trade London—Bengal.

On 30 August 1820 she had to put back to Calcutta as she was leaking badly. She had left Bengal for the Cape and London. She was condemned and sold on 6 October 1821 for breaking up.

Citations and references
Citations

References
 
  

1813 ships
Ships built in Whitby
Age of Sail merchant ships
Merchant ships of the United Kingdom